Fokele Hendrik Pieter "Boy" Trip (10 October 1921 – 26 January 1990) was a Dutch politician of the defunct Political Party of Radicals (PPR) now merged into GreenLeft (GL) and businessman.

Decorations

References

External links

Official
  F.H.P. (Boy) Trip Parlement & Politiek

1921 births
1990 deaths
Dutch academic administrators
Dutch corporate directors
Dutch hospital administrators
Dutch nonprofit executives
Dutch nonprofit directors
Dutch Roman Catholics
Knights of the Order of the Netherlands Lion
Members of the Senate (Netherlands)
Ministers without portfolio of the Netherlands
Political Party of Radicals politicians
People from Amersfoort
People from Laren, North Holland
20th-century Dutch businesspeople
20th-century Dutch politicians